Bozdoğan  is a village in Mut district of Mersin Province, Turkey. The population of Bozdoğan was 363 in 2020.

References

Villages in Mut District